Frederick Paul de Vere Capell, 11th Earl of Essex (born 29 May 1944) is the current Earl of Essex. He succeeded his father Robert Capell, 10th Earl of Essex, in 2005.

Born to Robert Capell and his wife Doris, Lord Essex began his life as Frederick Paul de Vere Capell. His father, a Lancashire grocer, was a distant cousin of the 9th Earl of Essex.

Capell’s career was as a schoolteacher. 
He was deputy head at Marsh County Primary School from 1966 to 1978, briefly headteacher at Cockerham Parochial Church of England School, from 1979 to 1980, and finally deputy head and Acting Head at Skerton County Primary School in Lancashire from 1981 to 1995.

When his father proved that he was the heir to the earldom in 1989, Paul Capel became entitled to the courtesy title of Viscount Malden. However, few people at his primary school knew of this, and when he inherited the earldom in 2005 The Daily Telegraph noted that the new Earl of Essex was "ever so humble".

Essex is unmarried at age . If he dies without a legitimate son, the earldom will pass to William Jennings Capell, his fourth cousin once removed, whose father, Bladen Horace, was a strong claimant to the earldom, before the 10th earl proved his better claim.

Shorthand titles
 Paul de Vere Capell, Esq (from birth; de jure until 1981; de facto until 1989)
 Viscount Malden (de jure from 1981, de facto from 1989, until 5 June 2005)
 The Right Honourable The Earl of Essex (since 5 June 2005)

Family tree

References

 Bunyan, Nigel; Fenton, Ben. New Earl of Essex is ever so humble, Daily Telegraph, June 18, 2005. Accessed August 22, 2010.
 Freer, Alan (2005). Conqueror6. Retrieved June 22, 2005.

1944 births
Living people
20th-century British people
21st-century British people
Paul
Paul